Protoceratidae is an extinct family of  herbivorous North American artiodactyls (even-toed ungulates) that lived during the Eocene through Pliocene at around 46.2—4.9 Mya, existing for about 41 million years.

Classification
Protoceratidae was erected by Othniel Charles Marsh in 1891, with the type genus Protoceras and assigned to the Artiodactyla. It was later assigned to Pecora, and more recently to Ruminantia or Tylopoda. However, recently a relationship to chevrotains in the infraorder Tragulina has been proposed.

Morphology
When alive, protoceratids would have resembled deer, though they were not directly related. Protoceratids ranged from 1 to 2 m in length, from about the size of a roe deer to an elk. Unlike many modern ungulates, they lacked cannon bones in their legs. Their dentition was similar to that of modern deer and cattle, suggesting they fed on tough grasses and similar foods, with a complex stomach similar to that of camels. At least some forms are believed to have lived in herds.

The most dramatic feature of the protoceratids, however, were the horns of the males. In addition to having horns in the more usual place, protoceratids had additional, rostral horns above their noses. These horns were either paired, as in Syndyoceras, or fused at the base, and branching into two near the tip, as in Synthetoceras. In life, the horns were probably covered with skin, much like the ossicones of a giraffe. The females were either hornless, or had far smaller horns than the males.  Horns were therefore probably used in sexual display or competition for mates. In later forms, the horns were large enough to have been used in sparring between males, much as with the antlers of some modern deer.

Genera by epoch

Eocene
 Heteromeryx
 Leptoreodon
 Leptotragulus
 Poabromylus
 Pseudoprotoceras
 Toromeryx
 Trigenicus

Oligocene
 Protoceras

Miocene
 Paratoceras
 Lambdoceras
 Prosynthetoceras
 Synthetoceras
 Syndyoceras

Pliocene
 Kyptoceras

References

Eocene even-toed ungulates
Miocene even-toed ungulates
Pliocene even-toed ungulates
Zanclean extinctions
Prehistoric mammals of North America
Prehistoric mammal families